The Miss Universo Italia or (Miss Universe Italy Organization) is a national pageant that currently selects the Italian representative for the Miss Universe pageant. The pageant was first organized in 1951 and it is not related to Miss Italia, although some delegates have crossed over from one format to the other throughout the years.

History

Since 1951, the official winner of Miss Italy represented at the Miss Universe until 1999 with the exception of a few select years in which a delegate was selected by casting or an independent pageant.

In 2005, Miss Universo Italia was created. From 2000 to 2004, the Italian representative was selected by the now defunct The Miss for Miss Universe pageant. Maria Teresa Francville had already won the right to represent Italy that year by virtue of winning The Miss for Miss Universe. When that pageant lost the franchise and was discontinued, she entered the newly created Miss Universo Italia competition and won again.

The most notable winners of the Miss Universo Italia pageant are Claudia Ferraris, who finished 9th at Miss Universe 2008, and Valentina Bonariva, who advanced to the Top 15 at the Miss Universe 2014 pageant.

Titleholders

Miss Universo Italia 

After 1999 Miss Universe Italy separated to be an independent contest to crown a winning title at Miss Universe. On occasion, when the winner does not qualify (due to age) for either contest, a runner-up is sent.

Miss Italia 1952-1999
 

Miss Italy has started to send a Winner to Miss Universe from 1952. In 1999 Miss Italia Organization dropped the Miss Universe franchise for Italy.

See also
 Miss Italia

References

Official website
Official website

 
Beauty pageants in Italy
Recurring events established in 1952
2005 establishments in Italy
Italian awards
Italy